An Achilles number is a number that is powerful but not a perfect power. In other words, every prime factor appears at least squared in the factorization. All Achilles numbers are powerful.

Achilles numbers were named by Henry Bottomley after Achilles, a hero of the Trojan war, who was also powerful but imperfect. Strong Achilles numbers are Achilles numbers whose Euler totients are also Achilles numbers.

Sequence of Achilles numbers
A number  is powerful if . If in addition  the number is an Achilles number.

The Achilles numbers up to 5000 are:
72, 108, 200, 288, 392, 432, 500, 648, 675, 800, 864, 968, 972, 1125, 1152, 1323, 1352, 1372, 1568, 1800, 1944, 2000, 2312, 2592, 2700, 2888, 3087, 3200, 3267, 3456, 3528, 3872, 3888, 4000, 4232, 4500, 4563, 4608, 5000 .

The smallest pair of consecutive Achilles numbers is:

 5425069447 = 73 × 412 × 972
 5425069448 = 23 × 260412

Examples
108 is a powerful number. Its prime factorization is 22 · 33, and thus its prime factors are 2 and 3. Both 22 = 4 and 32 = 9 are divisors of 108.

360 is not an Achilles number because it is not powerful. One of its prime factors is 5 but 360 is not divisible by 52 = 25.

Finally, 784 is not an Achilles number. It is a powerful number, because not only are 2 and 7 its only prime factors, but also 22 = 4 and 72 = 49 are divisors of it. Nonetheless, it is a perfect power:

So it is not an Achilles number.

500 = 22 × 53 is a strong Achilles number as its Euler totient of 200  = 23 × 52 is also an Achilles number.

References 

Integer sequences
Achilles